Ust-Kuyga is an urban locality (an urban-type settlement) in Ust-Yansky District of the Sakha Republic, Russia. on the Yana River. As of the 2010 Census, its population was 979.

Geography
The settlement is located by the Kyundyulyun mountains,  from Deputatsky, the administrative center of the district,

History
Urban-type settlement status was granted to Ust-Kuyga in 1967.

Administrative and municipal status
Within the framework of administrative divisions, the urban-type settlement of Ust-Kuyga is incorporated within Ust-Yansky District as the Settlement of Ust-Kuyga. As a municipal division, the Settlement of Ust-Kuyga is incorporated within Ust-Yansky Municipal District as Ust-Kuyga Urban Settlement.

Transportation
Ust-Kuyga is served by the Ust-Kuyga Airport .

References

Notes

Sources
Official website of the Sakha Republic. Registry of the Administrative-Territorial Divisions of the Sakha Republic. Ust-Yansky District. 

Urban-type settlements in the Sakha Republic
Populated places of Arctic Russia
Yana basin